Gordon F. Brown (birth registered fourth ¼ 1930) is an English World Cup winning former professional rugby league footballer who played in the 1950s and 1960s, and coached in the 1960s.

Background
Gordon Brown's birth was registered in Leeds district, West Riding of Yorkshire, England.

Playing career

International honours
Gordon Brown won caps for Great Britain while at Leeds in the 1954 Rugby League World Cup against Australia (2-tries), France (1-try), New Zealand (1-try), France (2-tries); and in 1955 against New Zealand (2 matches).

Gordon Brown played  in all four of Great Britain's 1954 Rugby League World Cup matches, including Great Britain’s 16-12 victory over France in the 1954 Rugby League World Cup Final at Parc des Princes, Paris on 13 November 1954.

Gordon Brown also represented Great Britain while at Leeds between 1952 and 1956 against France (1 non-Test match).

Club career
Gordon Brown made his début for Leeds against Halifax at Headingley Rugby Stadium, Leeds on Saturday 22 April 1950.

References

External links
!Great Britain Statistics at englandrl.co.uk (statistics currently missing due to not having appeared for both Great Britain, and England)
Profile at leedsrugby.dnsupdate.co.uk

1930 births
Living people
English rugby league players
Great Britain national rugby league team players
Keighley Cougars coaches
Keighley Cougars players
Leeds Rhinos players
Rugby league players from Leeds
Rugby league five-eighths